Kansas state elections in 2020 were held on Tuesday, November 3, 2020. The deadline to register to vote was October 13th, 2020. Early voting began October 14th, 2020. Voters in Kansas are eligible to vote absentee and there are no special eligibility criteria for voting absentee. Absentee ballots must be returned and received (in person or via mail) before November 2, 2020.

Federal offices

President of the United States 

Kansas had 6 electoral votes in the Electoral College. Nominees for the presidential election included Republican Donald Trump, Democrat Joe Biden, and Libertarian Jo Jorgensen. Republican Donald Trump won all the electoral votes with 56% of the popular vote.

United States Senate 

Kansas voted to replace retiring incumbent Republican Pat Roberts. Democrat Barbara Bollier, Republican Roger Marshall, and Libertarian Jason Buckley ran for this position in the general election. Republican Roger Marshall won with 53% of the vote.

United States House of Representatives 

Kansas voters voted for four U.S. Representatives, one from each of the state's four congressional districts. 3 Republicans and 1 Democrat were returned. No seats changed hands.

State offices

Kansas Executive Offices 
There are 5 seats in the State Board of Education that are up for election in Kansas this general election.

Kansas Senate 

All 40 seats in the Kansas Senate were up for election in 2020. Republicans won 29 seats and Democrats won 11 seats. There was no net seat change. Republicans gained Districts 18 and 19 while Democrats gained Districts 5 and 8.

Kansas House of Representatives 

125 seats were up for election in the Kansas House of Representatives in the general election of 2020. In the election, the Democrats lost two seats and the Republicans gained two.

Kansas Supreme Court 
There is one justice, Eric Rosen, of the Kansas Supreme Court whose appointment will expire on January 10, 2021 and is up for retention in this general election.

Appellate Courts 
Five justices of the Kansas Court of Appeals have terms that expire on January 10, 2021. Their seats are up for retention this general election. The justices include: Sarah Warner, David E. Bruns, G.Gordon Atcheson, Karen Arnold-Burger, and Kathryn Gardner.

Kansas Ballot Measures 
There are no statewide ballot measures certified for the 2020 general election in Kansas on November 3, 2020.

References

External links
 
 
  (State affiliate of the U.S. League of Women Voters)
 

 
Kansas
Kansas elections by year